Lawrence Robert Anderson (July 26, 1931 – March 20, 1984) was a Canadian professional ice hockey player who played in the National Hockey League. Born in Renfrew, Ontario, he played with the New York Rangers. He gave up the fastest hat trick in NHL history, in 21 seconds, to Bill Mosienko on March 23, 1952. After that Anderson was never seen in an NHL rink again.

External links 
 
 

1931 births
1984 deaths
Canadian ice hockey goaltenders
Ice hockey people from Ontario
New York Rangers players
New York Rovers players
People from Renfrew County
Canadian expatriate ice hockey players in the United States